Immediate Call (French: Rappel immédiat) is a 1939 French comedy drama film directed by Léon Mathot and starring Mireille Balin, Roger Duchesne and Bernard Lancret.

Cast
 Mireille Balin as Helen Wells  
 Roger Duchesne as Pierre Deschamps  
 Bernard Lancret as Gilbert Sellier  
 Erich von Stroheim as Captain Stanley Wells  
 Guillaume de Sax as Le metteur en scène  
 Raymond Aimos as L'électricien  
 Mady Berry as La femme du réserviste  
 Claire Gérard as L'habilleuse  
 Marcel Delaître as Le réserviste  
 Georges Bever as Le masseur Paul 
 Lucien Dalsace as L'officier  
 Jacques Tarride as Le secrétaire  
 Georges Paulais as Un agent 
 Pierre D'Ennery
 Henri de Livry 
 Marie-José 
 Frédéric Mariotti 
 Noëlle Norman 
 Marie-Claire Pissaro 
 Martial Rèbe 
 Eugène Stuber 
 Denise Vernac 
 Yvonne Yma

References

Bibliography
 Arthur Lennig. Stroheim. University Press of Kentucky, 2004.

External links
 

1939 films
1939 comedy-drama films
1930s French-language films
French comedy-drama films
Films directed by Léon Mathot
Films scored by Michel Michelet
French black-and-white films
1930s French films